Cerro Vicuñas is a volcanic mountain in the Andes of Chile which lies immediately north of Ojos del Salado. It has a height of 6067 metres. Vicuñas if often used as acclimatisation peak before major peaks like Ojos del Salado. Its slopes are within the administrative boundaries of the Chilean commune of Copiapo.

Elevation 
Other data from available digital elevation models: SRTM yields 6063 metres, ASTER 6041 metres and TanDEM-X 6109 metres. The height of the nearest key col is 5354 meters, leading to a topographic prominence of 726 meters. Vicuñas is considered a Mountain Subgroup according to the Dominance System  and its dominance is 11.94%. Its parent peak is Barrancas Blancas and the Topographic isolation is 6.3 kilometers.

First Ascent 
Vicuñas was first climbed by Eduardo Saavedra Larraín (Chile) and Theo Dowbenka (Austria) in 23rd of January 1979.

See also
List of mountains in the Andes

References

Vicunas
Volcanoes of Chile
Six-thousanders_of_the_Andes